"Vicious" is a song written by Lou Reed, released as a single in 1973 and originally featured on Transformer, Reed's second post-Velvet Underground solo album.

Origins
Lou Reed told Rolling Stone that Andy Warhol inspired the song: "He said, 'Why don't you write a song called 'Vicious'? And I said, 'What kind of vicious?' 'Oh, you know, vicious like I hit you with a flower.' And I wrote it down literally."

Reception
Cash Box said that "Reed's lyric has a somewhat sarcastic tone that makes the listener take note almost immediately. Here again, he shines with a driving rocker and a great story line that should make this effort a natural hit."

In popular culture
Vicious was featured on season 4, episode 5 of the Showtime TV series Billions.

This song was originally planned to be in Grand Theft Auto IV or Grand Theft Auto IV: The Lost and Damned on the fictitious radio station Liberty Rock Radio, but was deleted during the beta phase.

Personnel
Lou Reed - lead vocals, rhythm guitar
David Bowie - backing vocals
Mick Ronson - lead guitars
Herbie Flowers - bass
John Halsey - drums, cowbell, congas, maracas

References

External links
Vicious at Lyrics Freak

1972 songs
1973 singles
Songs written by Lou Reed
Lou Reed songs
Song recordings produced by David Bowie